St. Leo's Church is a historic Roman Catholic church complex located within the Archdiocese of Baltimore in Little Italy, Baltimore, Maryland, United States. It is the 'core' of the neighborhood.

Description
The church was built in 1880-81 of brick with stone trim, and combines Italianate, Romanesque, and Classical elements. It features a high entrance porch, a turret with conical roof on the north wall, a square bell tower at the northeast corner, a large rose window in the main façade, and a variety of decorative brickwork.  It was the first church in Maryland, and among the first in the nation, founded and built specifically for Italian immigrants.  The church was designed by Baltimore architect E. Francis Baldwin.

St. Leo's Church was listed on the National Register of Historic Places in 1983.  It houses an 1881 historic Niemann pipe organ.

"OUR HISTORY" from saintleorcc.com

Along with their skimpy possessions, a few lira and scruffy travel cases, the Italians also brought to America their sturdy Catholic faith. Once settled in Baltimore, they needed and wanted to put into action an even deeper devotion to God. They asked the Almighty Father to help them with homesickness, find employment, and adjust to a new way of life in a strange land.
    
The cornerstone of St. Leo's Church laid on September 12, 1880, at the northwest corner represented a concept much more significant over the next 136 years than a chunk of concrete. For not only did that cornerstone provide a tangible foundation for the church's physical structure, it also provided an emotional foundation for the Italians.
    
Truly, St. Leo's Church has been the nucleus of Little Italy since it was built, and that notion persists today. Many former residents of Little Italy say that one never really moves out of the neighborhood. As well, one can hardly shake a loyalty for St. Leo's parish – it runs through people's veins as much as their Italian ethnicity. The congregation of St. Leo's is a classic depiction of famiglia.

St. Leo's Church is significant both architecturally and for its association with 19th-century Italian immigration and the establishment of Baltimore's Italian community. It is the first church in Maryland, and among the first in the nation, founded and built specifically for Italian immigrants. Besides housing Masses said in Italian, it sponsored a variety of social, humanitarian, and civic programs aimed at acclimating Italian immigrants to life in America.

Immigrants from Italy began arriving in Baltimore in the early 19th century, and continued in a small but steady flow through the 1850s. They settled around President Street near the area today known as Little Italy. After the Civil War, immigration from Italy burgeoned. While some new arrivals were coming from all parts of Italy, most were artisans and laborers from Naples, Abruzzi and Sicily. They continued to settle along President Street, Albemarle, Stiles and Exeter Streets. By 1870, between one-third and one-half of that area's population was Italian and it eventually earned its name Little Italy.

These devout Catholics sought out the nearest Catholic church, at that time St. Vincent de Paul on North Front Street. Beginning in 1874, St. Vincent de Paul sponsored Italian Masses, yet it was not adequate to handle such a large influx of non-English-speaking congregants, nor was it conveniently located for the Italian community. Therefore, the Archdiocese of Baltimore decided to establish an all Italian parish, as it had earlier for Irish and German immigrants. Part of the role of these ethnic churches was to acclimate immigrants to American life and assist in their assimilation.

The lots for St. Leo's were purchased in June 1880 and construction began shortly thereafter. By the time the cornerstone was laid in September, the ground floor of the building was complete to a height of 10 feet. Parishioners begged the pastor to hold Mass even before the building had been completed - which he did. The building was dedicated one year later in September 1881. As the social and spiritual focus of Baltimore's Italian community (to this day), St. Leo's was the natural center for a variety of mutual aid societies, citizenship classes, and social service and community action organizations. Thus, for most Italian immigrants coming into Baltimore, it was the major institutional entry into American cultural, social, political and economic life.

Architecturally, the church building represents an unusual mix of Italianate, Romanesque and Classical elements, and is a good example of High Victorian eclecticism applied to a church. Designed by E. Francis Baldwin, it represents the work of a major figure in late 19th century Baltimore architecture. It also presents an interesting contrast with the bulk of Baldwin's better-known work, which was in commercial and industrial architecture. Baldwin was one of Baltimore's foremost architects in the late nineteenth century. St. Leo's presents an unusual and interesting example of his early work, contrasting sharply in style and scale with his mature work.

NOTEWORTHY FEATURES of Saint Leo's Church
[excerpted from the book, “Baltimore’s Little Italy: Heritage and History of The Neighborhood” by Suzanna Rosa Molino, a parishioner]

Murals & paintings: The painting above the altar was
commissioned in 1954, begun by one artist and finished by another.
Paintings of the Nativity and Resurrection appear on the lower curved
walls. The south rear wall of the church displays the Annunciation. The
inset mosaic on the right altar railing reads, Carita Christi Urget Nos
(The love of Christ urges us on), motto of the Pallottines. The left mosaic
is the coat of arms of Cardinal Lawrence Shehan and reads, Maria Spes
Nostra (Mary is our hope). Two mosaics on the exterior walls of the
church depict Saint Anthony and Saint Gabriele.

Calvary scene sculptures: In 1883, Fr. Andreis brought back
several works of art from Europe to display, including Mary and Saint
John the Evangelist sculptures on the Calvary scene under the crucifix.

Statues: Saint Vincent Pallotti stands to left of altar and is over
100 years old. Padre Pio on same side was a gift from the people of
Benevento, Italy. The Saint Leo's statue was a gift from the artist. The
statues of Saint Anthony (holding Jesus) and Saint Gabriele along the
right wall go back to the turn of the century.

Bell: Weighing 2,000 pounds and situated inside the bell tower,
the original bell was hoisted into place with a pulley and ropes tied to a
team of horses. The bell served as an important means of communication
around the neighborhood, tolling solemnly during funerals and ringing
joyfully during celebrations. Since the rope sometimes would break after
repeated pulls, a rope fixer would have to climb to the belfry to repair it.
Today, the Angelus bell chimes and plays music automatically.

Organ: Still in operation but restored in 1993 and 2016, is the
original and durable 138-year-old French-style organ crafted by an
immigrant German. Originally a pump model, altar boys had to pump its
huge bellows to assist the organist. The pipes vary enormously in size
and are accessible through a hidden panel.
Original features include paintings of angels in the vaulted
ceiling; the woodwork, and stained glass windows made in Germany. The
rounded windows (four on north side; three on south) feature biblical
designs. The wooden pews are original; their small seat widths are an
indication of the physical makeup of people in the 1800s.

Naturally, over the decades, the church building has encountered
cosmetic alterations. Yet what has never changed is the rock-solid
community of organizations, activities, parishioners, staff, and
volunteers bonded in faith that generously donate money, talent and
time to keep Saint Leo's as great as its name.

Gallery

References

External links
, including photo from 1981, at Maryland Historical Trust
Information from the Little Italy website
parish website
Roman Catholic Archdiocese of Baltimore

1881 establishments in Maryland
19th-century Roman Catholic church buildings in the United States
Italianate architecture in Maryland
Italian-American culture in Baltimore
Little Italy, Baltimore
Properties of religious function on the National Register of Historic Places in Baltimore
Roman Catholic churches completed in 1881
Roman Catholic churches in Baltimore
Churches on the National Register of Historic Places in Maryland
Italianate church buildings in the United States